Gunnar Axel Engelbrekt Hultgren (19 February 1902 - 13 February 1991) was a Swedish bishop within the Church of Sweden. He was the Archbishop of Uppsala between 1958 and 1967.

Biography
Hultgren was enrolled at Uppsala University  where he became a theology graduate in 1925, theology licentiate in 1933, and Dr. Theol. in 1940.  He became an associate professor of systematic theology in Uppsala in 1940. He became  vicar in the Diocese of Härnösand in 1940, Bishop of the Diocese of Visby in 1947 and Bishop of the Diocese of Härnösand in 1951. He was appointed Archbishop in 1958 and resigned as Emeritus in 1967.

References

Other sources
Hansson, Klas (2014)  Svenska kyrkans primas: Ärkebiskopsämbetet i förändring 1914–1990 (Uppsala: Acta Universitatis Upsaliensi)

External links

1902 births
1991 deaths
People from Södermanland County
Uppsala University alumni
Lutheran archbishops of Uppsala
Members of the Royal Society of Sciences in Uppsala